Michael Anthony Gerzon (4 December 1945 – 6 May 1996) is probably best known for his work on Ambisonics and for his work on digital audio.  He also made a large number of recordings, many in the field of free improvisation in which he had a particular interest.

Life 
After studying mathematics at Oxford University, Gerzon joined Oxford's Mathematical Institute working on axiomatic quantum theory, until his work in audio took him into working as a consultant.  At university he already had a keen interest in both the theory and practice of recording, which he shared with a few fellow students including Peter Craven (the two were later the co-inventors of the soundfield microphone, and collaborated on many other projects).

Over the next few years, this interest led to the invention of Ambisonics, which can be seen as a theoretical and practical completion of the work done by Alan Blumlein in the field of stereophonic sound. Although Ambisonics was not a commercial success, its theory underpinned much of his later work in audio such as his work with Waves Audio and Trifield. He was also active in the development of digital sound techniques, such as noise-shaped dither and Meridian Lossless Packing (MLP, the lossless compression used in DVD-Audio disks).

The Audio Engineering Society recognised Gerzon's work in audio by awarding him a fellowship in 1978 and the AES Gold Medal in 1991. He was also awarded the AES Publications Award posthumously in 1999.

Death 
Gerzon died in 1996 from complications resulting from a severe asthma attack.

Tape archive 
The British Library Sound Archive contains Gerzon's collection of tapes, which he kept from his student days. The collection consists of 400 hours of recordings.  A direct link to the collection is not possible; a search for the Collection title "Michael Gerzon tapes" will find them all by track. (An advanced search for Call Number "C236" with varying suffix numbers is a useful alternative that finds by tape.) Readers with a British Library card can book to hear tapes by appointment.

See also 
 The Snake Decides (1988), which he engineered
 Live Improvisations (1992), which he recorded
 On a Friday, whom he recorded
 The Jennifers, whom he recorded
 Ambisonics
 Oxford University Tape Recording Society, of which he was a member
 Soundfield microphone
 Noise-shaped dither
 Trifield
 Meridian Lossless Packing

Further reading

External links

Documentary
 A short documentary focusing on Michael Gerzon, and the work of the OUTRS; including interviews with Peter Craven and Paul Hodges can be seen here: https://www.youtube.com/watch?v=X23hZNoSkUs

Obituaries 
 Richard Elen of Meridian Audio Ltd.
 Waves Audio Ltd, a company for whom he consulted.
 John Borwick in Gramophone.
 Barry Fox in The Guardian.

Recorded tributes 
 Lines Burnt in Light by Evan Parker
 Sequoia by The Aquabats

Tape archive 
 The Michael Gerzon Archive, an article describing its preservation

Early work 
 Gerzon's Early Work, a website by Stephen Thornton.

Papers 
 The Gerzon Archive has a number of Gerzon's less mathematical papers in downloadable form.
 Stephen Thornton's website includes a list of publications and unpublished reports.
 The Waves obituary has a comprehensive list of Gerzon's papers at the end.

1945 births
1996 deaths
British audio engineers
Alumni of the University of Oxford
People from Birmingham, West Midlands
20th-century British inventors